Tim Van Laere Gallery is a contemporary art gallery in Antwerp, founded in 1997 by Tim Van Laere.  The gallery focuses both on the work of young, emerging artists and established international artists.

Ever since the gallery was founded, it has acquired a reputation on the global art scene, with artists from many different countries exhibiting works of all media (sculpture, painting, video, installation, photography). In the past couple of years, important names such as Kati Heck, Jonathan Meese, Anton Henning, Adrian Ghenie, Nicolas Provost and Rinus Van de Velde have all had solo shows at the gallery.

The gallery is showing 6 exhibitions per year and participates in a number of International Art Fairs.

Artists

Bram Demunter
Armen Eloyan
Gelitin
Adrian Ghenie
Kati Heck
Anton Henning
Leiko Ikemura
Tomasz Kowalski
Friedrich Kunath
Edward Lipski
Jonathan Meese
Ryan Mosley
Tal R
Peter Rogiers
Ben Sledsens
Ed Templeton
Rinus Van de Velde
Aaron Van Erp
Henk Visch
Franz West
Anke Weyer

References

Daily Art Fair
Art Research Map
Uit in Vlaanderen
Rinus Van de Velde - Hart magazine
The Culture trip, Antwerp's 10 Contemporary Art Galleries you should know

External links

Antwerp Art

Contemporary art galleries in Belgium
1997 establishments in Belgium
Art galleries established in 1997